Alexander Kirillov or Alexandre Kirillov may refer to:
Alexandre Kirillov (b. 1936), Russian mathematician
Alexander Kirillov, Jr., his son, Russian-American mathematician

See also
Kirillov